
Gmina Karsin is a rural gmina (administrative district) in Kościerzyna County, Pomeranian Voivodeship, in northern Poland.

The gmina contains part of the protected area called Wdydze Landscape Park.

Villages
Gmina Karsin contains the villages and settlements of Abisynia, Bąk, Białe Błoto, Borsk, Cisewie, Dąbrowa, Dębowiec, Górki, Jasnochówka, Joniny Małe, Joniny Wielkie, Karsin, Kliczkowy, Knieja, Lipa, Malary, Miedzno, Mniszek, Osowo, Piątkowo, Podrąbiona, Popia Góra, Przydół, Przytarnia, Robaczkowo, Rogalewo, Wdzydze Tucholskie, Wiele, Zabrody, Zamość and Żebrowo.

Neighbouring gminas
Gmina Karsin is bordered by the gminas of Brusy, Czersk, Dziemiany, Kościerzyna and Stara Kiszewa.

References
Polish official population figures 2006

Karsin
Kościerzyna County